Hibiscus rostellatus is a species of flowering plant in the family Malvaceae, native to seasonally dry tropical Africa. Its fruit is edible, and is cooked and eaten by local peoples.

References

rostellatus
Flora of West Tropical Africa
Flora of West-Central Tropical Africa
Flora of Northeast Tropical Africa
Flora of East Tropical Africa
Flora of South Tropical Africa
Plants described in 1831